Plessey Woods is a country park situated on the north bank of the River Blyth, in Northumberland. The park is accessed from the A192 in the village of Hartford Bridge, north of Cramlington and south west of Bedlington.

In 2016 Leading Link opened a youth-run Art Trail around Plessey Woods (www.plesseywoodstrail.weebly.com).

Around the trail there are wooden owls and painted snakes, including hobbit doors in the trees near the river bank.

Free parking (for up to an hour) is available on site, as is a visitor centre with toilets and shop.

External links
Plessey Woods page (Northumberland County Council)

Country parks in Northumberland